Hobart is a city in Lake County, Indiana, United States. The population was 29,890 at the 2020 census, up from 29,059 in 2010. It has been historically primarily residential, though recent annexation has added a notable retail corridor to the city.

History 
Hobart was platted in 1849. George Earle, an English immigrant, bought land from the Potawatomi Native American tribe, who built a dam on Deep River, creating Lake George. He named the settlement that later developed into Hobart, after his brother, Frederick Hobart Earle, who never left England. The first school of the city was built in 1878.

The First Unitarian Church of Hobart, Hobart Carnegie Library Hobart Commercial District, and Pennsylvania Railroad Station are listed in the National Register of Historic Places. The Lake George Commercial Historic District is noted locally. Hobart is also the site of several WPA projects, including a post office.

Geography

Demographics

2010 census
As of the census of 2010, there were 29,059 people, 11,650 households, and 7,664 families residing in the city. The racial makeup of the city was 85.3% White, 7.0% African American, 0.4% Native American, 1.0% Asian, 4.0% from other races, and 2.4% from two or more races. Hispanic or Latino of any race were 13.9% of the population.

There were 11,650 households, of which 31.3% had children under the age of 18 living with them, 48.4% were married couples living together, 12.1% had a female householder with no husband present, 5.3% had a male householder with no wife present, and 34.2% were non-families. 28.2% of all households were made up of individuals, and 10.8% had someone living alone who was 65 years of age or older. The average household size was 2.48 and the average family size was 3.06.

The median age in the city was 38 years. 23.1% of residents were under the age of 18; 7.9% were between the ages of 18 and 24; 28% were from 25 to 44; 26.6% were from 45 to 64; and 14.4% were 65 years of age or older. The gender makeup of the city was 48.5% male and 51.5% female.

2000 census
As of the census of 2000, there were 25,363 people, 9,855 households, and 6,977 families residing in the city. The racial makeup of the city was 93.73% White, 1.39% African American, 0.21% Native American, 0.54% Asian, 0.02% Pacific Islander, 2.60% from other races, and 1.51% from two or more races. Hispanic or Latino of any race were 8.05% of the population.

There were 9,855 households, out of which 30.6% had children under the age of 18 living with them, 56.3% were married couples living together, 10.4% had a female householder with no husband present, and 29.2% were non-families. 24.1% of all households were made up of individuals, and 10.4% had someone living alone who was 65 years of age or older. The average household size was 2.55 and the average family size was 3.04.

In the city, the population was spread out, with 23.6% under the age of 18, 8.6% from 18 to 24, 29.7% from 25 to 44, 23.0% from 45 to 64, and 15.1% who were 65 years of age or older. The median age was 38 years. For every 100 females, there were 94.4 males. For every 100 females age 18 and over, there were 91.7 males.

The median income for a household in the city was $34,759, and the median income for a family was $35,078. Males had a median income of $43,702 versus $26,619 for females. The per capita income for the city was $21,508. 4.8% of the population and 2.9% of families were below the poverty line. Of the total population, 5.8% of those under the age of 18 and 4.6% of those 65 and older were living below the poverty line.

Economy 
Hobart is home to a number businesses in its downtown shopping district, including the historic Art Theatre.

Hobart is also home to the super-regional Southlake Mall near the intersection of U.S. Route 30 and Interstate 65. and many surrounding retailers and restaurants, although most businesses along the south side of Hobart are required to list their addresses as Merrillville. This area was historically an unincorporated section of Ross Township prior to a 1993 annexation by the city of Hobart and is served by the Merrillville post office.

The nearest large airports serving Hobart are the Gary/Chicago International Airport (GYY) in Gary and Chicago Midway International Airport (MDW) and O'Hare International Airport (ORD) in nearby Chicago.

Hobart contains three major railroads: Norfolk Southern Railway, which runs through County Line Road to Liverpool Road; Chicago, Fort Wayne and Eastern Railroad, which runs through County Line Road to Wisconsin Street; and Canadian National Railway, which runs through Colorado Street and through a portion of Hobart in the southernmost part of the area known as Ainsworth.

Hobart is also home to the Indiana Botanic Gardens, which is the nation's largest and oldest retailer of herbs. The company moved to Hobart in the mid-1990s and is located off Business Route 6. Another manufacturing concern headquartered in Hobart since 1952 is Midwest Products, a manufacturer of hobby materials and radio controlled model aircraft.

Parks and recreation 

Hobart is home to Lake George, a popular place for people to gather to walk along the city's waterfront. Musical entertainment can be found near the clock tower in Lakefront Park and at the Revelli Bandshell during the warm months. Fishing and boating are two popular activities at Lake George. At Festival Park, people can feed the ducks that live there. In the past, fishermen fished at Hobart's Robinson Lake. In October 2006, then-Mayor Linda Buzenic announced the "highest and best use" for Robinson Lake would be to put it up for sale, according to the Post-Tribune.

The city features 14 parks, a public 18-hole golf courses (Cressmoor Country Club having closed in 2006), and many sports fields for basketball, football, baseball, soccer, rugby, and other sports. The city recently bought an outdoor swimming pool. Hobart Nature District is located in Hobart.

The Oak Savannah rails-to-trails route cuts through the city and offers biking and hiking. The Oak Savannah trail passes by the  Hobart Prairie Grove Unit of Indiana Dunes National Park.

The Shirley Heinze Land Trust, Inc. owns other nature preserves in the city of Hobart, including a tallgrass prairie. The Cressmoor Prairie is a dedicated state nature preserve, and is the largest state-protected rare "black soil" or silt-loam prairie in Indiana.

Education
Most of the city is within the School City of Hobart, although other parts of the city are within the River Forest Community School Corporation or the Merrillville Community School District. Hobart High School students are referred to as the "Brickies," in reference to the brickyards that were once located on city's northern side near Cressmore Prairie. The school mascot is named Yohan and bears a strong resemblance to "Boilermaker Pete" from Purdue University. Hobart High School at one time was considered a leader in music education; in the early twentieth century, its band won national Sousa band competitions under the direction of William Revelli, who later left to lead the University of Michigan band. The city is also home to Trinity Lutheran School, a pre-school through 8th grade parochial school and Montessori Academy in the Oaks.

The Merrillville section is served by John Wood Elementary School and the feeder schools in Merrillville.

The Lake County Public Library operates the Hobart Branch.

Notable people

Omar Apollo - singer-songwriter
Larry Bigbie - professional baseball player
Brent Dickson - Justice of the Indiana Supreme Court (1986 - ), Chief Justice (2012-2014)
Darren Elkins - professional MMA fighter
Brian Gallagher - president and chief executive officer of United Way Worldwide
Tim Gill - computer scientist and LGBT activist
Bob Kuechenberg - professional football player
Rudy Kuechenberg - professional football player
Dale Messick - graphic artist, creator of comic strip Brenda Starr
Craig Osika - professional football player, and Hobart High School football coach
Gary Primich - blues musician and recording artist
William Revelli - band director, first in Hobart and later at University of Michigan
Everett Robinson, minor league baseball player and manager

References

External links

 City of Hobart, Indiana website

Cities in Indiana
Cities in Lake County, Indiana
Northwest Indiana
Populated places established in 1889
1889 establishments in Indiana
Sundown towns in Indiana